William Henry Lee (June 26, 1799 – September 11, 1878) was a Canadian civil servant and the first Clerk of the Privy Council of Canada.

Born in Trois-Rivières, Lower Canada (now Quebec), he was educated in Montreal. In 1821, he became an extra clerk for the Executive Council of Upper Canada. From 1867 to 1872, he was the clerk of the Privy Council. Being the first Clerk of the Privy Council, he was a Father of Confederation.

References
 

1799 births
1878 deaths
Clerks of the Privy Council (Canada)